Oniferi is a comune (municipality) in the Province of Nuoro in the Italian region Sardinia, located about  north of Cagliari and about  southwest of Nuoro.

Oniferi borders the following municipalities: Benetutti, Bono, Orani, Orotelli.
 
The Oniferi economy is mostly based on animal husbandry. Sights include several Nuragic and pre-Nuragic archaeological sites, such as the Necropolis of Sas Concas.

References

Cities and towns in Sardinia